Nightline is an album by the American soul singer Randy Crawford. It was released in 1983 via Warner Brothers Records.

The album peaked at No. 164 on the Billboard 200. It peaked at No. 37 on the UK Albums Chart. The title track peaked at No. 51 on the UK Singles Chart.

Production
The album was produced by Tommy LiPuma; among Crawford's backing musicians were members of Toto.

Critical reception

The Philadelphia Inquirer wrote: "Nightline has a smooth, creamy sound that never turns mushy. For the first time, Crawford's authoritative vocals sustain a whole album, giving shape and power to pretty material. A real surprise."

AllMusic called the album "a nice combination of jazzy, sophisticated ballads, a few harder-hitting numbers, and some heartache material."

Track listing

Personnel
Randy Crawford - vocals 
James Newton Howard - keyboards, string arrangement, rhythm arrangements (3, 4), synthesizer (3, 6), synthesizer arrangements (6)
Robbie Buchanan - keyboards (1, 2, 5), synthesizer, synth arrangements (1, 2)
 Denzil "Broadway" Miller - keyboards (6-10)
Cecil Womack - guitar, rhythm arrangements (1-6), background vocals (6, 7, 9, 10)
David Williams - guitar (2, 5)
Steve Lukather - rhythm guitar (1) 
Dann Huff - guitar solo (2)
Larry Carlton - guitar solo (4)
Nathan East - bass guitar (1-5)
Abe Laboriel - bass guitar (6-10)
Bill Cuomo - bass synthesizer (6)
John Robinson drums (1, 2, 5)
Jeff Porcaro - drums (3, 4)
James Gadson - drums (6-10)
Reek Havoc - Simmons drums (6)
Arnold McCuller (1, 2, 4), *Linda Womack Friendly Womack (6,7, 9, 10)Brenda Russell (1, 2), David Lasley (1, 2), Carmen Twilley (4, 5), Clydene Jackson  - background vocals (4), Julia Waters Till Woman (5), Maxine Waters Willard (5) - background vocals 
Lenny Castro - percussion (all tracks)
Dale Oehler - string arrangements (7-10)
Nick De Caro - contractor, string arrangements (7-10)
Ivy Scoff, Jan Abbazia, contractor
Al Schmitt - engineering, mixing
Tommy LiPuma - production

References

Randy Crawford albums
1983 albums
Warner Records albums
Albums produced by Tommy LiPuma